Edward Junior Wilson (born September 22, 1984 in Monrovia) is a Liberian footballer (forward) playing currently for Persipura Jayapura in Indonesia Soccer Championship A. He is also a member of the Liberia national football team. Made his international debut (2005). He was the top scorer in Liga Indonesia Premier Division 2009-2010 with 20 goals.

Honours

Club 
Semen Padang
Winner
 Indonesia Premier League: 2011–12
 Indonesian Community Shield: 2013

Individual 
Winner
Liga Indonesia Premier Division Top Scorer: 2009–10

External links
 
 Edward Junior Wilson - liga-indonesia.co.id

1984 births
Living people
Liberian footballers
Liberia international footballers
Expatriate footballers in Indonesia
Association football forwards
Mighty Barrolle players
Sportspeople from Monrovia
Expatriate footballers in Malaysia
Liberian expatriates in Malaysia